Maykel Demetrio Massó Bavastro (born 8 May 1999) is a Cuban long jumper. He competed at the 2015 World Championships in Beijing without qualifying for the final. He competed at the 2020 Summer Olympics.
 
His personal bests in the event are 8.39 metres outdoors (+0.6 m/s, La Habana 2021) and 8.08 metres indoors (Karlsruhe 2021).

Competition record

See also
 Cuba at the 2015 World Championships in Athletics

References

Cuban male long jumpers
Living people
Place of birth missing (living people)
1999 births
World Athletics Championships athletes for Cuba
Athletes (track and field) at the 2016 Summer Olympics
Olympic athletes of Cuba
Athletes (track and field) at the 2019 Pan American Games
Pan American Games competitors for Cuba
Athletes (track and field) at the 2020 Summer Olympics
Medalists at the 2020 Summer Olympics
Olympic bronze medalists in athletics (track and field)
Olympic bronze medalists for Cuba
20th-century Cuban people
21st-century Cuban people